Matthews Ridge is a high, mostly snow-covered ridge,  long, on the south side of Tapsell Foreland, Victoria Land, Antarctica. The ridge forms the east wall of McElroy Glacier and terminates to the south at Barnett Glacier. It was mapped by the United States Geological Survey from surveys and U.S. Navy air photos, 1960–63, and was named by the Advisory Committee on Antarctic Names for Jerry L. Matthews, a geologist who worked in the Horlick Mountains, 1965–66, and the McMurdo Station area, 1966–67.

References

Ridges of Victoria Land
Pennell Coast